Maiden High School is a public high school located in Maiden, North Carolina, United States. It is part of the Catawba County Schools district.

Overview
Maiden High School was founded in 1953. In 2006, Maiden High moved from its former older building (which is now Maiden Middle School), to a newly built campus, which houses its current location. The school contains an auditorium, auxiliary gym, main gym, auto shop, wood shop, and a culinary arts shop. The school consists of a main circle, with 7 halls branching out. Maiden High School operates on a four block schedule. Each block is an hour and thirty-five minutes long.

Athletics
Sport programs at the school include football, basketball, soccer, tennis, cross country, golf, track, cheerleading, softball, volleyball, baseball, and wrestling.

Notable alumni
 Cherie Berry, former politician and North Carolina Commissioner of Labor
 Caleb Farley, current NFL cornerback
 Kevin Wilson, college football coach

References

Schools in Catawba County, North Carolina
Educational institutions in the United States with year of establishment missing
Public high schools in North Carolina